Batocera wyliei is a species of beetle in the family Cerambycidae. It was described by Chevrolat in 1858. It is known from Cameroon, Angola, the Democratic Republic of the Congo, the Central African Republic, the Republic of the Congo, Equatorial Guinea, Gabon, the Ivory Coast, Nigeria, and Uganda.

References

Batocerini
Beetles described in 1858